The Superbowl of Wrestling was an event held in the 1970s.  It was one of the first professional wrestling "Supercards".

History

1972

The first Superbowl of Wrestling was held in Cleveland, Ohio at Municipal Stadium on August 12, 1972.  Three rings were set up, side by side, and often more than one match would be going on at a time. Attendance figures have been estimated as high as 20,000 and as low as 5,000.  No reliable sources seem to agree on a number.

Here are partial results of the show:
Tony Marino & Tony Parisi defeated Motoji Okuma & Mashio Koma to win the tag team tournament
Tag team tournament opening round matches: Manuel Soto & Victor Rivera went to a double-DQ with Waldo Von Erich & Karl Von Stroheim, Tony Marino & Toni Parisi won by default. Luis Martinez & Sal Dominguez d. Tex McKenzie & Lil Abner. 
Semifinals: Koma & Okuma d. Luis Martinez & Sal Dominguez. 
Finals: Tony & Toni d. Koma & Okuma).
Sue Green & Lily Thomas defeated Tippy Wells & Peggy Patterson to win the women's tag team tournament
Sky Low Low & Little Brutus defeated Haiti Kid & Frenchy Lamont to win the midget tag team tournament
NWF World Tag Team Champions the Fargo Brothers (Don & Johnny Fargo)  defeated Wahoo McDaniel & Chief White Owl
NWA Women's World Tag Team Champions Toni Rose & Donna Christanello defeated Sandy Parker & Debbie Johnson
NWA World Women's Champion The Fabulous Moolah defeated Vicki Williams
NWA United States Champion Bobo Brazil defeated Killer Tim Brooks
Ernie Ladd vs. Abdullah the Butcher ended in a double disqualification
NWF North American Champion Johnny Powers defeated Johnny Valentine

1978

Another Superbowl of Wrestling was held on January 25, 1978.  This Superbowl of Wrestling was held at the Orange Bowl in Miami, Florida, drawing over 12,000 fans for a unification match between the WWWF and NWA World Championships. Here are the results:
Rocky Johnson defeated Killer Karl Kox via DQ
Ivan Putski defeated Ox Baker
Joyce Grable won an eight woman battle royal that also included Suzette Ferriera, Leilani Kai, Pepper LaBianca, Winona Littleheart, Tandy Rich, Terry Shane, and Vicki Williams
Chavo Guerrero defeated Tank Patton
Bobby Duncum defeated Don Serrano
Keith Franks defeated John Ruffin
Mike Graham & Steve Keirn defeated The Valiant Brothers (Jimmy & Johnny Valiant) to win the NWA Florida United States Tag Team Championship
Pedro Morales defeated Lars Anderson
Jack & Jerry Brisco defeated Ivan Koloff & Mr. Saito
Dusty Rhodes defeated Ken Patera
WWWF World Champion Superstar Billy Graham  vs. NWA World Heavyweight Champion Harley Race ended in a 60-minute time limit draw during a three fall match
Gorilla Monsoon and Don Curtis were the special referees for the match, which saw Graham defeat Race via submission in the first fall, Race won the second fall at the 46 min mark with his trademark suplex.the 3rd fall was a bloody battle with Race having Superstar in a sleeper hold in the last minute, Superstar was on his back, shoulders down with ref Don Curtis counting to 1 when the 60 min time limit ran out  the match tied at a fall each, it was declared a draw.

References
1972 Superbowl of Wrestling results
1978 Superbowl of Wrestling results

WWE shows
National Wrestling Alliance shows
1972 in Ohio
1978 in Florida
1972 in professional wrestling
1978 in professional wrestling
Events in Miami
Events in Cleveland
Professional wrestling in Miami
Professional wrestling in Cleveland